Meeting in Vienna (Swedish: Möte i Wien) is a 1951 Swedish romance novel by Margit Söderholm. A woman returns to post-war Vienna twenty years after she enjoyed a romance with a student there.

References

Bibliography
 Gaster, Adrian. The International Authors and Writers Who's Who. International Biographical Centre, 1977.

1951 Swedish novels
Novels by Margit Söderholm
Novels set in Vienna